Masjid Al-Mamoor, also known as the Jamaica Muslim Center, is one of the largest multi-purpose Muslim establishments in Jamaica, New York. The center includes a mosque, a school, and a place for religious gatherings and eating facilities. Masjid Al-Mamoor was started by mostly Bangladeshi Americans in 1976, as it is located in the heavily Bangladeshi-American locality of Jamaica, New York.

References

External links

Asian-American culture in New York City
Bangladeshi-American culture
Mosques in New York City
Non-profit organizations based in New York City
Religious buildings and structures in Queens, New York
Jamaica, Queens